Barefoot Foundation is a Colombian charity founded by pop artist Shakira in 1997, with the aim of helping poor and impoverished children. The Barefoot Foundation mission statement is "The Barefoot Foundation works to ensure that every Colombian child can exercise their right to a quality education. Our model targets displaced and vulnerable communities by addressing their unique needs."

The foundation's main focus is on aid through education, and the organization has five schools across Colombia that provide education and meals for 4,000 children.

On 27 April 2014 Shakira was honoured with the Hero Award at the Radio Disney Music Awards for her Barefoot Foundation work.

2004 efforts 
In 2004 the work of the Foundation turned to Shakira's hometown of Barranquilla. The Foundation built two new schools, Escuela Las Americas and Escuela Siete de Abril. The schools brought change to two neighborhoods that had been devastated by displacement, homelessness and poverty. The two Barefoot schools provided services for 990 children.

That same year, Barefoot initiated work in Soacha, Cundinamarca, a suburb on the outskirts of Bogotá. According to the Colombian Social Welfare Network, Soacha has one of the highest rates of incoming victims of displacement. Their work began at the Gabriel Garcia Marquez and El Minuto schools in the Altos de Cazuca neighborhoods, providing opportunities for another 980 children.

The year 2004 was significant for the Barefoot Foundation. They reached many of their goals, working with children whose lives were disrupted because of the Colombian conflict. Many children were given access to an education, better nutrition, and a new sense of hope. The foundation also initiated a school cafeteria that was managed totally by the neighborhood moms.

Funding 
Support for the foundation comes from contributions by Shakira and donations from national and international companies who care about social responsibility. They also work with multilateral corporations who endorse special projects and have formed alliances with government agencies. During February 2008, Shakira auctioned some of her tour clothes and guitars on eBay to support her foundation.

In February 2011, the FC Barcelona Foundation and Barefoot reached an agreement for children's education through sport.

References

External links 
 Barefoot Foundation official site
 Unofficial Photos (Spanish)
 Interview with Camilo Guerrero González, Fundación Pies Descalzos School Meals and the Barefoot Foundation

Barranquilla
Shakira
Educational charities
Child-related organisations in Colombia
Children's rights organizations
Organizations established in 1997